Ferguson is an Anglicization of the Scots Gaelic “Macfhearghus", a patronymic form of the personal name Fergus which translates as son of the angry (one).

Notable people with the name

Surname
Abbie Park Ferguson (1837–1919), American educator, founder of Huguenot College
Adam Ferguson (disambiguation), multiple people
Adele Ferguson, Australian investigative journalist
Alan Ferguson (politician) (born 1943), Australian politician
Alan Ferguson (director) (born 1963), American music video director
Alex Ferguson (disambiguation), multiple people
Amy Ferguson, American actress
Andrew Ferguson (born 1956), American journalist
Andy Ferguson (born 1985), Scottish footballer
Barry Ferguson (born 1978), Scottish footballer
Benjamin Ferguson (disambiguation), multiple people
Blake Ferguson (disambiguation), multiple people
Bob Ferguson (disambiguation), multiple people
Caleb Ferguson (born 1996), American baseball player
Calum Ferguson (born 1995), Canadian soccer player
Charles Ferguson (disambiguation), multiple people
Chip Ferguson, American football player
Chris Ferguson (born 1963), American professional poker player
Christopher Ferguson (born 1961), American astronaut
Clarence Clyde Ferguson, Jr. (1924–1983), American ambassador and professor of law
Colin Ferguson (born 1972), Canadian-born American actor
Connie Ferguson (born 1970), South African actress, film-maker, businesswoman and producer
Cool John Ferguson (born 1953), American blues guitarist, singer and songwriter
Craig Ferguson (born 1962), Scottish-born American comedian, actor, writer, and television host
Daniel Ferguson (disambiguation), multiple people
Darren Ferguson (born 1972), Scottish football player and manager
David Ferguson (disambiguation), multiple people
D'Brickashaw Ferguson (born 1983), American football player
Dennis Ferguson (1948–2012), Australian convict
Denver D. Ferguson (1895–1957), American businessman, club owner and agent
Derek Ferguson (born 1967), Scottish footballer
Don Ferguson (disambiguation), multiple people
Duncan Ferguson (born 1971), Scottish footballer
Dwight Ferguson (born 1970), Bahamian sprint athlete
Ego Ferguson (born 1991), American football player
Elsie Ferguson (1883–1961), American stage and film actress
Emma Ferguson (born 1975), British actress
Eric Ferguson (disambiguation), multiple people
Eustace William Ferguson (1884–1927), New Zealand pathologist and entomologist

F–L
Fern Ferguson, All-American Girls Professional Baseball League player
Gary Ferguson (born 1963), American professor of French
Gary Ferguson (nature writer) (born 1956), American writer
Gene Ferguson (born 1947), American football player
George Ferguson (disambiguation), multiple people
Gil Ferguson (1923–2007), American politician
Glenn Ferguson (born 1969), Northern Irish footballer
Glenn W. Ferguson (1929–2007), American diplomat and academic administrator
Hannah Ferguson (born 1992), American model
Harry Ferguson (1884–1960), Irish tractor designer and industrialist
Heather M. Ferguson, malaria vector biologist
Helaman Ferguson (born 1940), American sculptor
Howard Ferguson (composer) (1908–1999), British composer of Irish birth
Howard Ferguson (1870–1946), ninth premier of Ontario, Canada
Hughie Ferguson (1895–1930), Scottish football player
Iain Ferguson (born 1962), Scottish football player
Iain Ferguson (businessman) (born 1955), British businessman
Ian Ferguson (disambiguation), multiple people
Isaac Edward Ferguson (1888–1964), American political activist and attorney
Jack Ferguson (1924–2002), Australian politician
Jake Ferguson (born 1999), American football player
James Ferguson (disambiguation), multiple people
Jason Ferguson (disambiguation), multiple people
Jaylon Ferguson (born 1995), American football player
Jeff Ferguson (disambiguation), multiple people
Jesse Tyler Ferguson (born 1975), American actor
Jim Ferguson (born 1948), American guitarist/composer
John Ferguson (disambiguation), multiple people
Julian Ferguson (1895–1965), Canadian MP
Judith Lynn Ferguson, American–British author and chef
Karen Ferguson, American lawyer
Kathleen Ferguson (born 1958), Northern Irish writer
Keith Ferguson (disambiguation), multiple people
Ken Ferguson (politician) (born c. 1951), American politician
Kent Ferguson (born 1963), American diver
Kitty Ferguson (born 1941), American science writer
Laurie Ferguson (born 1952), Australian politician
Lockie Ferguson (born 1991), New Zealand cricketer
Lynn Ferguson (born 1965), Scottish actress and writer
Lynnette Ferguson, New Zealand academic

M–Z
Manie Payne Ferguson (1850–1932), Irish/American founder of the Peniel Mission and hymn-writer
Mark Ferguson (disambiguation), multiple people
Martin Ferguson (footballer) (born 1942), Scottish football player, manager and scout
Martin Ferguson (politician) (born 1953), Australian politician
Matthew Ferguson (born 1973), Canadian actor
Max Ferguson (1924–2013), Canadian radio personality and satirist
Maynard Ferguson (1928–2006), Canadian jazz trumpet player
Megan Ferguson (born 1983), American actress
Michael Ferguson (disambiguation), multiple people
Miriam A. Ferguson (1875–1961), Governor of Texas
Myles Ferguson (1981–2000), Canadian actor
Naomi Ferguson, Commissioner of the New Zealand Inland Revenue Department
Nathan Ferguson (disambiguation), multiple people
Niall Ferguson (born 1964), Scottish historian of British imperialism and international finance
Patricia Ferguson (born 1958), Scottish politician
Patrick Ferguson (disambiguation)]], multiple people
Priah Ferguson (born 2006), American child actor
Ralph Ferguson (1929–2020), Canadian MP
Rebecca Ferguson (disambiguation), multiple people
Richard Ferguson, multiple people
Riley Ferguson (born 1995), American football player
Robert Ferguson (disambiguation), multiple people
Roger W. Ferguson Jr. (born 1951), American economist, former Federal Reserve Vice Chair
Ronald Ferguson (disambiguation), multiple people
Rork Scott Ferguson (born 1884), Canadian Member of Parliament
Ryan Ferguson (disambiguation), multiple people
Samuel Ferguson (disambiguation), multiple people
Sandy Ferguson (disambiguation), multiple people
Sarah Ferguson (disambiguation), multiple people
Scott Ferguson (born 1973), Canadian National Hockey League defenseman
Scott Ferguson, American film and television producer
Sheila Ferguson (born 1947), American lead singer of the pop group Three Degrees
Shonel Ferguson (born 1957), Bahamian sprint athlete and long jumper
Shona Ferguson (1974–2021), Botswanan actor, executive producer and co-founder of Ferguson Films
Fergie (born Stacy Ann Ferguson in 1975), American singer-songwriter and actress
Stephen Ferguson, Scottish musician
Steven Ferguson (disambiguation), multiple people
Susie Ferguson, New Zealand radio presenter
Terrance Ferguson (born 1998), American basketball player
Thomas Ferguson (disambiguation), multiple people
Tim Ferguson (born 1963), Australian comedian
Tony Ferguson (born 1984), American MMA fighter
Timothy R. Ferguson (born 1955), Maryland politician
Verell Ferguson (1859–1923), Mississippi politician
Will Ferguson (born 1964), Canadian travel writer and novelist
William Ferguson (disambiguation), multiple people
Wilburn Ferguson (1905-1998), American alternative medicine researcher

Given name
Ferguson Jenkins (born 1943), Canadian MLB baseball player
Ferguson John, Caribbean politician, minister in Saint Lucia from 1997 to 2006
Ferguson Cheruiyot Rotich (born 1989), Kenyan middle-distance runner

Fictional characters
 Ferguson Darling, fictional character on Clarissa Explains It All
 Archie "The Ferg" Ferguson, a deputy on the TV series Longmire
 Robert Ferguson, a character in the Sherlock Holmes short story The Adventure of the Sussex Vampire
 Russell Ferguson, a character in Littlest Pet Shop
 Samuel Ferguson, the protagonist of Jules Verne's Five Weeks in a Balloon
 Ferguson, Winston Bishop’s pet cat in FOX’s New Girl

See also
Fergie (disambiguation)
Fergusson (disambiguation)

References

Anglicised Scottish Gaelic-language surnames
Scottish surnames
English-language surnames
Masculine given names
Surnames of Ulster-Scottish origin
Patronymic surnames
Surnames from given names